Songjiaqiao is a subdistrict of Hetang District in Zhuzhou, Hunan, China. The town has 7 villages and 3 communities under its jurisdiction.

History
The subdistrict of Songjiaqiao was formed in 1969, it was originally a subdistrict of East District in Zhuzhou. Through the district adjustment of Zhuzhou in 1997, the East District was dissolved, the subdistrict was transferred to Yuetang District formed in the year. 

In 2005, its three communities of Jingoushan, Yanjiawan and Xianghua were merged to Jinshan Subdistrict, its four communities of Guihua, Xinhe, Zhaojiachong and Xiangyang to Guihua Subdistrict.

In 2017, Five villages of Fenlukou, Xingxing, Jintang, Mingzhao and Longzhou from Xianyu Town were changed to the subdistrict.

Subdivisions
In 2017, Five villages of Fenlukou, Xingxing, Jintang, Mingzhao and Longzhou from Xianyu Town were merged to the subdistrict. The subdistrict has 7 villages and 3 communities under its jurisdiction.

7 villages
 Fenlukou Village
 Jintang Village
 Longzhou Village
 Mingyue Village
 Songjiaqiao Village
 Tiantai Village
 Xingxing Village

3 communities
 Furong Community
 Sisanling Community
 Yuegui Community

References

Hetang District
Towns of Hunan